Yamb is a public domain dice game similar to Yacht and Yahtzee (trademarked by Hasbro in the United States).

Gameplay 
Yamb can be played solitaire or by any number of players.  Players take turns rolling five dice.  After each roll, the player chooses which dice to keep, and which to reroll.  A player may reroll some or all of the dice up to two times on a turn. The player must put a score or zero into a score box each turn. The game ends when all score boxes are used. The player with the highest total score wins the game.

The table consists of several columns (usually 4 or 6) and two sections.

Each column is filled according to the following rules:

Basic columns 
Up - The column fills down from top to bottom (first you need to enter the category of ones, then twos, etc.).
Down - The column fills up from the bottom to top (first you need to enter the yamb category, then carriage, etc.).
Free (or Random) - The column is filled without any restrictions.
Announce - To make an entry in this column you have to submit declarations after first turn giving the desired category. The entry can not then be changed.

Extra columns 
It is possible to expand the game with additional columns selected at the discretion of the players. The most common additional columns include:

Up-Down - The column fills up from bottom and top at the same time.
Middle  - The column fills in both directions (from MIN up and from MAX down)
Hand - the entry into the column can be made only after first roll. (Without the two rerolls)
Maximum - column entry can only be made when the point value is close to the maximum value.

Scoring 
The following combinations earn points:

Upper Section 
 Ones: The sum of all dice showing the number 1.
 Twos: The sum of all dice showing the number 2.
 Threes: The sum of all dice showing the number 3.
 Fours: The sum of all dice showing the number 4.
 Fives: The sum of all dice showing the number 5.
 Sixes: The sum of all dice showing the number 6.

If a player manages to score at least 63 points (an average of three of each number) in the upper section, they are awarded a bonus of 30 points.

Lower Section 

Two Pairs and Full House must have different numbers so that the combination 15566 will score 32 as Two Pairs, but 15555 will score nothing in that category.

Differences from Yahtzee 
Yahtzee rules and scoring categories are somewhat different from Yamb: 
 The bonus for reaching 63 or more points in the Upper Section is 30 points.
 Yahtzee does not have the "Two Pair" categories.
 Full House scores a fixed 25 points.
 Small Straight is any four sequential dice (1-2-3-4, 2-3-4-5, or 3-4-5-6) and scores a fixed 30 points while Large Straight is any five sequential dice (1-2-3-4-5 or 2-3-4-5-6) and scores 40 points.
 Four of a kind scores a sum of all dice without any extra points.
 Five of a kind (Yahtzee) scores a fixed 50 points.
 Yahtzee introduces Yahtzee bonuses and a Joker rule when a player scores a second Yahtzee.
 Yahtzee has a "Chance" category instead of "MIN" and "MAX" categories.
 Yahtzee does not have the columns.

See also
Game design

References 

Sequence dice games
pl:Kości (gra)#Yamb